AY Ceti, also known as 39 Ceti, is a star about 244 light years from Earth in the constellation Cetus. It is a 5th magnitude star, making it faintly visible to the naked eye of an observer far from city lights. AY Ceti is an RS Canum Venaticorum variable (RS CVn) star, varying in brightness from magnitude 5.35 to 5.58 over a period of about 77 days.

In 1962, Alan Cousins discovered that AY Ceti is a variable star, varying by just 0.12 magnitudes during the five nights that he observed it. In 1976 it was given the variable star designation AY Ceti. In 1983, Joel Eaton et al. examined photoelectric photometry data for the star spanning more than a decade, and determined that the brightness varied periodically by 0.18 magnitudes every  days. They stated that AY Ceti's variability and spectral features lead them to believe it is an RS CVn star. Long term monitoring by Ennio Poretti et al. showed that the amplitude of the brightness oscillations is not constant, and there are secular drifts in the average brightness over timescales much longer than the phototmetric period.

In 1982, Theodore Simon et al. announced that IUE spectra revealed that AY Ceti is a spectroscopic binary, with a hot white dwarf (component B) companion orbiting a cooler star (component A). They also announced the detection of radio wavelength flare events. In 1985 follow-up publication, these authors derived an orbital period of  days, differing by more than 20 days from the photometric period, making AY Ceti one of the few (just two known at that time) RS CVn systems for which the orbital and photometric periods are grossly different.

AY Ceti A is believed to be a star on its first ascent up the red-giant branch, close to the bottom of the red giant branch where first dredge-up occurs.  It is thought to be undergoing the dredge-up now, but with convection not yet reaching the core of the star.

Notes
1.These orbital elements were derived assuming a circular orbit. An earlier derivation found non-zero eccentricity of ~0.1.

References

Cetus (constellation)
005951
007672
Ceti, AY
0373
RS Canum Venaticorum variables
White dwarfs
G-type giants
Emission-line stars